The 2019 Spanish Athletics Championships was the 99th edition of the national championship in outdoor track and field for Spain. It was held on 31 August and 1 September at the Ciudad Deportiva Camilo Cano in La Nucia. It served as the selection meeting for Spain at the 2019 World Championships in Athletics.

The club championships in relays and combined track and field events were contested separately from the main competition.

Results

Men

Women

Notes

References
Results
XCIX Campeonato de España Absoluto . Royal Spanish Athletics Federation. Retrieved 2019-09-08.

External links 
 Official website of the Royal Spanish Athletics Federation 

2019
Spanish Athletics Championships
Spanish Athletics Championships
Spanish Championships
Athletics Championships
Sport in the Valencian Community